Peter Wekesa (born 22 September 1961) is a Kenyan sprinter. He competed in the men's 100 metres at the 1988 Summer Olympics.

References

1961 births
Living people
Athletes (track and field) at the 1988 Summer Olympics
Kenyan male sprinters
Olympic athletes of Kenya
Athletes (track and field) at the 1982 Commonwealth Games
Commonwealth Games competitors for Kenya
Place of birth missing (living people)